Sir Ronald Hadfield  (15 July 1939 – 31 January 2013) was the Chief Constable of the West Midlands Police from June 1990 until July 1996. He had previously served with Lancashire Constabulary, Greater Manchester Police and Derbyshire Constabulary and was, from 1987 to 1990, Nottinghamshire Police's chief constable. His nickname was "Biffo".

Career
During his time with the West Midlands Police, he oversaw the Hadfield Report into the Birmingham pub bombings. He was International Vice-President of the International Association of Chiefs of Police.

Following his retirement from the police, he was appointed as a consultant in training and people management by the firm of Edge & Ellison.

In the 1995 Queen's Birthday Honours, Hadfield was appointed a Knight Bachelor for services to Police.

Death
He died on 31 January 2013, aged 73, and was survived by his wife, Anne.

References 

Chief Constables of West Midlands Police
1939 births
2013 deaths
English recipients of the Queen's Police Medal
Knights Bachelor
People educated at the Radclyffe School